Hee Gyathang Monastery is a Buddhist monastery situated in Upper Dzongu, North Sikkim in northeastern India. It was built by hermit Abi Putso Rangdrol in 1914.

References

Buddhist monasteries in Sikkim
Tibetan Buddhist monasteries and temples in India